The Franses Tapestry Archive and Library in London is devoted to the study of European tapestries  and figurative textiles.  It is the world’s largest academic research resource on the subject.

History
Established in 1987, the archive was co-founded by Simon Franses, a director of the Franses Gallery and Tom Campbell, a tapestry scholar. After 7 years of full-time work Dr Campbell  moved to New York to take up a curatorial post at the Metropolitan Museum of Art.  He went on to curate two landmark Tapestry exhibitions Tapestry in the Renaissance: Art and Magnificence (2002) and Tapestry in the Baroque: Threads of Splendor (2007).  In 2008 he was appointed director of the museum.

The vast collection of images began to be collected by Dr Campbell with a team of research assistants,  and was gathered from across Europe and America.  The Archive has continued to expand over 29 years. It now holds over 240,000 visual records of European tapestries accessible by subject, date, country of manufacture and place of origin. These records have been collected and catalogued from several hundred museums, libraries, auction houses, trade and private collections, and allows precise identification of individual works (as well as visual reconstruction of dispersed sets of tapestries).

Mission
To collect images and data on every significant European tapestry and figurative textile.
To identify, classify, cross-reference and conserve these.
To increase knowledge by collecting books, related articles, and documentation on design,  commissioning, origin, production, use, value, provenance.
To increase appreciation and understanding of this art form.

Archive

The images are stored under almost 900 main headings from Landmark Series of European Tapestries to more modest works, altar frontal, table carpets, cushions and upholstery.

The Collection includes:
 Visual records: 240,000 +
 Reference Books: 2,760
 Articles: 3,600
 Catalogues of major collections: 450
 Sale catalogues and periodicals: 20,000

Other archives, collections and photos

Institutions 
 The V & A Marillier Tapestry Subject Catalogue, fifty volumes of script and photographs, donated to the Nation in 1945
 Musée Royaux d’art et d’histoire, Brussels, Archive of Flemish Tapestries
 The Burrell Collection, Glasgow
 Musée des Arts Décoratifs, Paris

Private collections 
 Donald King, donated by Monique King
 Edith Standen
 Jack Franses

Galleries 
 Bernheimer, Munich 
 Duveen, New York
 S Franses, London
 French & Company, New York
 Hamot, Paris 
 C John, London
 Mayorcas, London
 Perez, London 
 Rosenberg & Steibel, New York
 Seligman, Paris

Research projects
The Archive has undertaken a number of research projects.  A joint survey with the National Trust of the Tapestries in their 200 historic houses was carried out.   Assistance is given to academics and scholars and where copyright is owned, images are made available for publication.

A project with Glasgow City Art Gallery and Museum assembling documentation from the Archive on Sir William Burrell’s collection of medieval tapestries.  The Burrell Collection has appointed two international tapestry scholars to catalogue this Tapestry collection.  The archive assisted with the academic research  and securing loans for the "History Woven in Threads" an Exhibition of Medieval and Renaissance Tapestries held in 2014 at Palace of the Grand Dukes of Lithuania, Vilnius.

Surveys
National Trust Survey
US Public Collections Survey

Lost and stolen 
Several missing or stolen pieces have been recovered through the Archive –  in 1993  two Gobelins Tapestries stolen from the Institute of Fine Arts, New York, were located and returned, and a Brussels Tapestry stolen from North Mymms Park, England.  In 2001 The Art Loss Register deposited images of missing or stolen tapestries and textiles.

Other uses of the documentation
The documentation is also used to provide appraisals for government indemnity in the case of inter-museum loans, grant-giving bodies and Acceptance in Lieu.

References

Further reading

General

Museum collections

Flemish tapestry

French tapestry

German tapestry

British tapestry

Italian tapestry

Other

External links 
 V&A  http://www.vam.ac.uk/page/t/tapestry/
 Met http://www.metmuseum.org/toah/hd/tapb/hd_tapb.htm
 West Dean  https://www.westdean.org.uk/study/school-of-creative-arts/tapestry-studio
 Dovecote Studios https://dovecotstudios.com/tapestry-studio/about/
 Studies in Western Tapestry https://www.arts.kuleuven.be/studiesinwesterntapestry
Franses Tapestry Archive http://fransestapestryarchive.org/ (with information for Users Group)

Tapestries
Archives in the City of Westminster